John Bartlett (also John Bartlet) (October 5, 1677 – August 5, 1761) was a member of the Connecticut House of Representatives from Norwalk, Connecticut Colony in the May 1718 session.

He was the son of Benjamin Bartlett and Deborah Barnard, or alternatively, Richard Bartlett (1648-1724) and Hannah Emery (1654-1705).

He owned land on Bartlett Ridge, a height west of the west branch of the Norwalk River.

References 

1677 births
1761 deaths
Burials in Pine Island Cemetery
Connecticut lawyers
Members of the Connecticut House of Representatives
Politicians from Norwalk, Connecticut